Raipur–Hyderabad Expressway , part of Raipur–Hyderabad Economic Corridor, is a planned greenfield, access-controlled,  long, six-lane expressway through Red corridor in Chhattisgarh, Maharashtra and Telangana states of central, West-central and South India Raipur - Hyderabad Expressway
As per the current proposal by NHAI, this expressway will reach Hyderabad from Raipur via Durg, Rajnandgaon, Gadchiroli, Gondpipri, Ramagundam and Karimnagar.  In this, a 104 km long expressway is to be built inside Chhattisgarh and 77 km in Maharashtra.  A total road length of 181 km will be built by connecting Chhattisgarh and Maharashtra.  The remaining 338 km of road will be built in Telangana.

References

Expressways in Chhattisgarh
Expressways in Maharashtra
Expressways in Telangana
Proposed expressways in India
Transport in Raipur, Chhattisgarh
Transport in Hyderabad, India